This is a list of football stadiums that contain standing areas (or terracing), home to teams which play in English Football League or National League. Although the Taylor Report states that all Premier League and EFL Championship stadiums should eventually be converted to all-seaters, some teams have not done so as they either cannot afford to do so or because they want to maintain the atmosphere of their ground.

References

Association football culture
T
English Football League
stadiums